"Feel Good (It's Alright)" is a song by the British deep house production duo Blonde with vocals by the English recording artist Karen Harding. The song was released in the United Kingdom as a digital download on 14 August 2015 through FFRR Records and Parlophone. The song samples the 1992 song "You Make Me Feel Good" by J.K.

Music video
A music video to accompany the release was released onto YouTube on 14 August 2015 with a total length of three minutes and seventeen seconds.

Track listing

Charts

Release history

References

2015 singles
2015 songs
Blonde (duo) songs
Karen Harding songs
FFRR Records singles
Parlophone singles
Song recordings produced by Mark Ralph (record producer)
Song articles with missing songwriters